Beaverlodge/Clanachan Aerodrome  is located  southwest of Beaverlodge, Alberta, Canada.

See also
 Beaverlodge Airport

References

Registered aerodromes in Alberta
County of Grande Prairie No. 1